Hermann Küppel was a West German luger who competed in the mid-1950s. He won a silver medal in the men's doubles event at the 1955 European luge championships in Hahnenklee, West Germany.

References
List of European luge champions 

Year of birth missing
Possibly living people
German male lugers